Horacio de la Peña was the defending champion, but did not participate this year.

Jason Stoltenberg won the title, defeating Gabriel Markus 3–6, 6–3, 6–4 in the final.

Seeds
A champion seed is indicated in bold text while text in italics indicates the round in which that seed was eliminated.

  MaliVai Washington (first round)
  Mikael Pernfors (first round)
  Richey Reneberg (second round)
  Jason Stoltenberg (champion)
  Luiz Mattar (first round)
  Jacco Eltingh (quarterfinals)
  Grant Stafford (second round)
  Bryan Shelton (second round)

Draw

External links
 Singles draw

Singles